Juan Ignacio Dinenno De Cara (born 28 August 1994) is an Argentine professional footballer who plays as a striker for Liga MX club UNAM.

Honours
Individual
Liga MX Best XI: Guardianes 2020
CONCACAF Champions League Golden Boot: 2022
CONCACAF Champions League Best XI: 2022
Liga MX All-Star: 2022

References

External links
 
 Juan Dinenno at Pumas.mx

1994 births
Living people
Footballers from Rosario, Santa Fe
Argentine footballers
Association football forwards
Argentine expatriate footballers
Expatriate footballers in Ecuador
Expatriate footballers in Colombia
Expatriate footballers in Mexico
Argentine expatriate sportspeople in Ecuador
Argentine Primera División players
Primera Nacional players
Ecuadorian Serie A players
Categoría Primera A players
Liga MX players
Racing Club de Avellaneda footballers
Club Atlético Temperley footballers
Aldosivi footballers
C.D. Cuenca footballers
Deportivo Cali footballers
Club Universidad Nacional footballers